Israel–Lithuania relations are foreign relations between Israel and Lithuania. Israel recognized Lithuania's independence in 1991. Both countries established diplomatic relations in 1992. Israel is represented in Lithuania through its embassy in Vilnius. Lithuania has an embassy in Tel Aviv and two honorary consulates, in Herzliya and Ramat Gan.

There are 3,600 Jews living in Lithuania. Both countries are full members of the Union for the Mediterranean.

See also 
 Foreign relations of Israel
 Foreign relations of Lithuania
 Lithuanian Jews
 History of the Jews in Lithuania
 Israel–European Union relations

References

External links 
  Israeli embassy in Riga (also accredited to Lithuania)
  Lithuanian Ministry of Foreign Affairs: list of bilateral treaties with Israel (in Lithuanian only)
  Lithuanian embassy in Tel Aviv 

 

 
Lithuania
Bilateral relations of Lithuania